Corbadrine (INN; marketed as Neo-Cobefrine), also known as levonordefrin (USAN) and α-methylnorepinephrine, is a catecholamine sympathomimetic used as a topical nasal decongestant and vasoconstrictor in dentistry in the United States, (usually in a pre-mixed solution with local anesthetics, such as mepivacaine).

Corbadrine is also a metabolite of the antihypertensive drug methyldopa, and plays a role in its pharmacology and effects.

See also 
 α-Methyldopamine
 α-Methyltyramine

References

External links 
 

Alpha-1 adrenergic receptor agonists
Alpha-2 adrenergic receptor agonists
Beta-adrenergic agonists
Catecholamines
Norepinephrine releasing agents
Phenylethanolamines
Substituted amphetamines